Walter Lee Hardy (December 1, 1925 – September, 1980) was an American Negro league shortstop in the 1940s.

A native of Lakeland, Florida, Hardy was known as a flashy fielder, but a weak batter. Following his Negro league career, he continued to play throughout the early 1950s for the Saint-Jean Canadiens of the Provincial League.

After his playing career, Hardy became a business partner of Baseball Hall of Famer Roy Campanella, and died in Rockland County, New York in 1980 at age 54.

References

External links
 and Seamheads

1925 births
1980 deaths
Kansas City Monarchs players
New York Black Yankees players
New York Cubans players
St. Jean Braves players
St. Jean Canadians players
20th-century African-American sportspeople
Baseball infielders